The 2003 Skyrunner World Series was the 2nd edition of the global skyrunning competition, Skyrunner World Series, organised by the International Skyrunning Federation from 2002.

Results
The World Cup has developed in 7 races from June to September.

References

External links
 Skyrunner World Series

2003